Robert Maxwell Young (September 26, 1935 – July 5, 2019) was an American-born historian of science specialising in the 19th century and particularly Darwinian thought, a philosopher of the biological and human sciences, and a Kleinian psychotherapist.

Career
Young was born in Highland Park, a suburb of Dallas, Texas. His initial education was in the United States, at Yale University and the University of Rochester Medical School, but in 1960 he moved to the University of Cambridge for his PhD on the history of ideas of mind and brain. The resulting monograph, Mind, Brain and Adaptation, has been called 'a modern classic' by Peter Gay.  From 1964 to 1976 he was a Fellow and Graduate Tutor of King's College, Cambridge and became the first Director of the Wellcome Unit for the History of Medicine set up within the Department of History and Philosophy of Science, University of Cambridge.  From 1976 to 1983 he was a full-time writer. In this period much of his political activities and writing involved radical critiques of science, technology and medicine. His contribution in this area has been compared by historian Gary Werskey with that of J. D. Bernal (While this is Werskey's opinion, it was not, according to Francis Aprahamian, Bernal's research assistant for "Science in History", a view shared by J.D. Bernal himself (personal communication F.A.) Instead Bernal saw Steven Rose a natural scientist, outspokenly left wing and active in the Anti-Vietnam War movement as a younger version of himself.) In any case, Young, while deeply respectful, strived to go beyond Bernal's agenda.

Thought
In various books and papers he argued that science, technology and medicine—far from being value-neutral—are the embodiment of values in theories, things and therapies, in facts and artefacts, in procedures and programs. Succinctly put, all facts are theory-laden, all theories are value-laden, and all values occur within an ideology or world view. Scientists and technologists pursue agendas; they have philosophies of nature, world views, usually tacitly held. In studies extending across a broad spectrum of disciplines he has argued that our culture is disastrously riven. It is characterised by sharp dichotomies, each and every one of which is a false (or, at least, overdrawn) dichotomy, but our beliefs in them preclude unified deliberations about the scientific and the moral:

                        humanities - science
                           society - science
                           culture - nature
                       qualitative - quantitative
                             value - fact
                           purpose - mechanism
                           subject - object
                          internal - external
                          secondary- primary (qualities)
                           thought - extension
                              mind - body
                         character - behaviour

In order to foster such unified deliberations he set up the publishing house Free Association Books which (while he directed it) published in the areas of cultural theory, critiques of expertise, and psychoanalysis, broadly conceived. The press has been called, inter alia, 'the most important influence on the culture of psychoanalysis since the war' (by Andrew Samuels). He also trained as a Kleinian psychoanalytic psychotherapist and began writing on psychoanalysis, but he continued writing and editing in the areas of social theory, the philosophy of science and Darwinian thought and its impact on culture. He then became the first professor of Psychoanalytic Studies and of Psychoanalytic Psychotherapy, posts he held at the Centre for Psychotherapeutic Studies at the University of Sheffield Medical School until his retirement, after which he worked in private practice in London. He was a registrant of the British Psychoanalytic Council.

The unifying thread in his research, political activities, writing and clinical practice was the understanding of human nature and the alleviation of suffering and inequality. His work was typically  interdisciplinary, seeking to promote unity in how we think about nature, human nature and culture.

In addition to his books, listed below, he wrote numerous scholarly and popular articles, as well as making a number of television documentaries in the series Crucible: Science in Society. He also founded (usually with others) Free Association Books, Process Press, Radical Science Journal, Science as Culture, Free Associations and Kleinian Studies, as well as a number of email forums and egroups in his areas of interest and the websites.

Personal life
Young’s partner at the time of his death was Susan Tilley. He had married and was divorced from Barbara Smith, with whom he had a son, and Sheila Ernst, with whom he had two daughters. He had a long relationship with Margot Waddell, with whom he had a son and a daughter, and with Em Farrell, with whom he  had  a daughter.

Bibliography
 Mind, Brain and Adaptation. Oxford: Clarendon Press, 1970; reprinted in History of Neuroscience Series N.Y.: Oxford, 1990.
 Changing Perspectives in the History of Science. London: Heinemann, 1973 (co-editor with M. Teich and contributor).
 Darwin's Metaphor: Nature's Place in Victorian Culture. Cambridge University Press, 1985; reprinted 1988, 1994.
 Science, Technology and the Labour Process, 2 vols. Free Association Books, 1981, 1985 (co-editor with L. Levidow and contributor).
 Mental Space. Process Press, 1994.
 Oedipus Complex. Icon Books, 2001.

 Published on-line
 The Culture of British Psychoanalysis and Related Essays on Character and Morality and on The Psychodynamics of Psychoanalytic Organization, 1996.
 Whatever Happened to Human Nature?, 1996.
 Group Relations: An Introduction (co-author with David Armstrong and Gordon Lawrence), 1997.

See also
 Naturalization of value systems

References

External links 

 Robert M. Young website
 Email forums in his areas of interest
 Most of his writings
 Assessments of his work and influence

1935 births
2019 deaths
Academics of the University of Sheffield
Alumni of the University of Cambridge
21st-century American historians
21st-century American male writers
American medical historians
American psychotherapists
Charles Darwin biographers
Fellows of King's College, Cambridge
Historians of science
University of Rochester alumni
Yale University alumni
American male non-fiction writers